Mary C. Brinton is an American sociologist. She is the Director of the Edwin O. Reischauer Institute of Japanese Studies at Harvard University.

Early life and education
Brinton completed her Bachelor of Arts degree in linguistics at Stanford University before enrolling at the University of Washington (UW) for her graduate degrees. At UW, she completed two Master's degrees in Japan Area Studies and Sociology before finishing her PhD.

Career
Upon completing her PhD, Brinton became an associate professor in Sociology at the University of Chicago in 1986. In this role, she accepted an Abe Fellowship in 1994 from the Social Science Research Council for her research project The School-Work Transition: A Comparative Study of Three Industrial Societies. Following this fellowship, she co-edited a book entitled The new institutionalism in sociology and became a fellow at the Center for Advanced Study in the Behavioral Sciences at Stanford University from 1999–2000. Brinton then became a Professor of Sociology at Cornell University until 2002 when she joined Harvard University as their Reischauer Institute Professor of Sociology. As a professor at Harvard in 2006, Brinton accepted a Fulbright Scholarship to assist her project "Out of School, Out of Work? The Changing Youth Labor Market in Japan."

Following her Fulbright Scholarship, Brinton began focusing on low-birth-rate countries by interviewing young adults about their prospects and plans for parenthood. She collaborated with researchers in Spain, Japan, and Sweden to examine how attitudes towards childbirth measured across genders and how they have changed over time. During this time, Brinton published Lost in Transition: Youth, Work, and Instability in Postindustrial Japan through the Cambridge University Press in 2011 and was awarded the John Whitney Hall Book Prize from the Northeast Asian Council of the Association for Asian Studies. She subsequently accepted a Radcliffe College fellowship from 2013 to 2014 to continue her comparative project on fertility in postindustrial societies. 

In July 2018, Brinton was appointed Director of the Edwin O. Reischauer Institute of Japanese Studies for a three year term.

Evaluation 
MARCH 15, 2021, Brinton made the following statement by the Reischauer Institute of Japanese Studies Requesting the retraction of a paper written by a professor belonging to the Institute for Japanese Studies. Although South Korean media assessed that the institute had expressed serious concerns about the paper,As a result, it had a negative impact on the trial of prof. 류 석춘 over freedom of expression that was being held in South Korea.

Selected publications
The following is a list of selected publications:
Women and the Economic Miracle: Gender and Work in Postwar Japan (1993)
The New Institutionalism in Sociology (2001)
Gender and Work (2007)
Women’s Working Lives in East Asia (2010)
Lost in Transition: Youth, Work, and Instability in Postindustrial Japan (2011)

References

External links

Living people
Date of birth missing (living people)
Year of birth missing (living people)
American women sociologists
Stanford University alumni
University of Washington alumni
Harvard University faculty
University of Chicago faculty
Cornell University faculty